Charles Edward Jones (June 12, 1935 – December 20, 2018) was an American lawyer who served as a justice of the Arizona Supreme Court from 1996 to 2002 and then as the chief justice of the court from 2002 to 2005. Jones was a member of the Church of Jesus Christ of Latter-day Saints (LDS Church) and served in several positions in the church.

Biography 
Jones was born and raised in Lethbridge, Alberta. He served as a missionary of the LDS Church in the French Mission in the 1950s, which included France and the French-speaking portions of Belgium and Switzerland. In 1959, he graduated from  Brigham Young University with a Bachelor of Arts. He then received a Juris Doctor from  Stanford Law School.

Jones married Elizabeth Ann Anderson, a native of Safford, Arizona. They were the parents of seven children.

Jones was admitted to the bar in California in 1962 and then admitted to the bar in Arizona in 1964. From 1963 he was part of the firm of Jennings, Stouss & Salmon and was the head of their labor and employment division. From 1994 to 1998 Jones was the national chair of the  J. Reuben Clark Law Society.

In the LDS Church, Jones has served in several positions including as a bishop and stake president. From 1990 to 1993 he served as president of the France  Paris Mission.

Jones died on December 20, 2018, from complications of a brain aneurysm. One of Jones's daughters is Utah journalist Ruth Todd.

References 

 https://web.archive.org/web/20070604152849/http://www.supreme.state.az.us/azsupreme/jones.htm
 Church News, January 12, 2002; February 17, 2000

1935 births
2018 deaths
20th-century American judges
20th-century American lawyers
20th-century Mormon missionaries
21st-century American judges
American leaders of the Church of Jesus Christ of Latter-day Saints
American Mormon missionaries in France
Arizona lawyers
Brigham Young University alumni
Canadian emigrants to the United States
Canadian leaders of the Church of Jesus Christ of Latter-day Saints
Canadian Mormon missionaries
Chief Justices of the Arizona Supreme Court
Justices of the Arizona Supreme Court
Latter Day Saints from Arizona
Mormon missionaries in Belgium
Mormon missionaries in Switzerland
Stanford Law School alumni